Silvia Raaymakers  (born ) is a retired Dutch volleyball player. She was part of the Netherlands women's national volleyball team.

She participated in the 1994 FIVB Volleyball Women's World Championship. On club level she played with Bonduelle VVC.

Clubs
 Bonduelle VVC (1994)

References

1974 births
Living people
Place of birth missing (living people)
Dutch women's volleyball players